Dick Todd (August 4, 1914 – May 1973) was a Canadian pop singer, most active from the 1930s to 1950s. He was nicknamed the Canadian Crosby, due to his supposed vocal similarity to Bing Crosby, and was born in Montreal.

Early years
Todd sang in school programs as early as age 6. When he was 14, he worked as a log driver in a lumber camp.

His public schooling came at Macdonald Campus of McGill University and went on to study engineering at McGill. where he also played football. (Another source says that he was a music major at McGill.)

Radio
Todd sang on a radio program in Canada in 1933.

After he came to the United States in 1938 to sing on broadcasts of Larry Clinton's orchestra, Todd became a favourite with radio listeners across the country.

During 1944–1945, Todd spent a year on a USO tour, entertaining troops during World War II. He returned to network radio July 28, 1945, on Your Hit Parade, replacing Lawrence Tibbett as the featured male singer, counterpart to Joan Edwards.

He was a soloist on programs such as Melody and Madness, Avalon Time, Rinso-Spry Vaudeville Theatre, Hometown Incorporated, and Show Boat.

Recording
In the late 1930s, Todd signed a contract with RCA Victor to record for the company's Bluebird Records label. During his career he recorded such hits as "You're the Only Star in My Blue Heaven", "It's A Hap-Hap-Happy Day" and "Blue Orchids". In a 1940 magazine article, a writer commented, "He has the heaviest record-making schedule of any singer in the country."

Film
Todd "made a couple of short features for Paramount Pictures."

References

External links
Dick Todd on Last.Fm
Dick Todd at AOL Music
Dick Todd at The Canadian Encyclopedia
 Forgotten Ones: Dick Todd
Dick Todd featured in Radio and Television Mirror, January 1942

1914 births
1973 deaths
20th-century Canadian male singers
Anglophone Quebec people
Bluebird Records artists
Canadian pop singers
Crooners
Singers from Montreal
McGill University Faculty of Agricultural and Environmental Sciences alumni
McGill University Faculty of Engineering alumni
Canadian expatriates in the United States